This article lists all power stations in Eswatini.

Hydroelectric

See also 
 List of power stations in Africa
 List of largest power stations in the world

Eswatini
 
Power stations